Volkamer lemon (Citrus volkameriana), often misspelled Volckamer lemon, is known as 沃 尔卡默柠檬 (Wo er ka mo ning meng) in Chinese, citron de Volkamer in French, limone Volkameriano in Italian, and chanh Volkamer in Vietnamese. It is a Citrus hybrid cultivated for its edible fruit. The specific epithet (volkameriana) honors German botanist Johann Christoph Volkamer.

Distribution
It likely originated in Italy and is most widely grown in the United States and Europe, and to a smaller extent in eastern Asia.

Description
Like the Rangpur lime and rough lemon, it is a hybrid of a mandarin orange (C. reticulata) and a citron (C. medica), with the citron being the pollen parent and the mandarin being the seed parent. The fruit is moderately large (around the size of an orange), seedy, round and slightly elongated, and yellow-orange in color. The flavor is not as unpleasant as one might expect. It ripens from winter to early spring. The tree is densely branched and high-yielding, often weighed down because of the fruits. The leaves are elliptical in shape and the flowers have five white petals. It is hardy to USDA zone 9. The tree is fast-growing and adaptable to many soil conditions. It is not susceptible to tristeza virus, exocortis, or xyloporosis viroids, but is susceptible to citrus nematode and phytophthora root rot but less so than the rough lemon.

Uses
It has been cultivated for three centuries and is used as a rootstock for other Citrus cultivars because of its resistance to many diseases that affect members of the genus Citrus.

Availability
It is commercially available in the United States through the Citrus Clonal Protection Program.

See also
List of citrus fruits

References

Citrus
Citrus hybrids
Plants described in 1847
Lemons
Citron
Edible fruits
Fruit trees
Fruits originating in Europe